Szczechy may refer to the following places in Poland:

Szczechy Małe
Szczechy Wielkie